Dorcadion subinterruptum is a species of beetle in the family Cerambycidae. It was described by Pic in 1900. It is known from Turkey.

Varietas
 Dorcadion subinterruptum var. exiguum Breuning, 1946
 Dorcadion subinterruptum var. indivisum Pic, 1900
 Dorcadion subinterruptum var. interruptevittatum Breuning, 1946
 Dorcadion subinterruptum var. posticeconjunctum Breuning, 1946

References

subinterruptum
Beetles described in 1900